The War (German: Der Krieg) is a series of 50 drypoint and aquatint etchings by German artist Otto Dix, catalogued by Florian Karsch as K.70 to K.119.  The prints were published in Berlin in 1924 by Karl Nierendorf, in an edition which included separate high quality folio prints, and a lower-quality version with 24 prints bound together.  It is often compared to Francisco Goya's series of 82 engravings The Disasters of War. The British Museum, which holds a complete set of the folio prints, has described the series as "Dix's central achievement as a graphic artist"; the auction house Christie's has described it as "one of the finest and most unflinching depictions of war in western art".

Background 
Dix was born in 1891, and studied art in Dresden before the First World War.  He was conscripted in 1915, and served in the Imperial German Army as a machine gunner on both the Eastern Front and the Western Front.  After the war, he returned to study at the Dresden Academy of Fine Arts, and then in Italy.  He was a founder of the short-lived avante-garde Dresdner Sezession art group, and then supported the post-expressionist New Objectivity movement.

His horrific experiences in the trenches inspired the anti-war art he created after 1920.  Dix came to public attention when featured by Theodor Däubler in Das Kunstblatt in 1920.  In 1921, Otto Dix met Karl Nierendorf, an art dealer in Berlin, who became his agent and publisher.  Dix's large anti-war painting The Trench ("Der Schützengraben") caused great controversy when first exhibited in Cologne in 1923.  It was confiscated as degenerate art (Entartete Kunst) by the Nazis, and lost during the Second World War.

Dix's reputation for controversy continued in 1925, when he successfully defended himself against charges of indecency following exhibitions in Berlin and Darmstadt of two paintings of prostitutes.  He became a professor at the Dresden Academy in 1927, and returned to anti-war sentiments for his 1929 to 1932 triptych, also entitled The War (Der Krieg), the central panel of which reworks themes from The Trench: this painting been held by the Galerie Neue Meister in Dresden since 1968.

Description 
Dix's War prints were published in 1924, the tenth anniversary of the outbreak of the war, as an antidote to the heroic interpretation of the war.  Dix had seen Goya's series of 82 engravings The Disasters of War in Basel: he was inspired by Goya's etching technique that combined etching and aquatint to depict horrific scenes from the Napoleonic Wars in Spain, and created a similar series of etchings of atrocities from the First World War.

Among the other influences on Dix's prints were the works of Urs Graf, Jacques Callot's Miseries of War print series, and Goya's painting The Third of May 1808.  Some of the scenes also draw inspiration from preparatory sketches for his 1923 painting The Trench, and others from a visit to the catacombs in Palermo in 1923–24, and the wartime photographs of Ernst Friedrich, published as Krieg dem Kriege ("War against War") in 1924.

In the series, Dix depicts scenes of executions and famine, with trenches and corpses amid the desolate landscapes in Flanders and the Somme.  He shows images of emaciated and decaying corpses, grimacing skeletons, bodies crucified or impaled on barbed wire, the wounded with bulging eyes and open flesh, in a hallucinatory dance macabre.  The prints are based on wartime photographs, hundreds of sketches that Dix made during the war, and his own memories.

Ten of the prints highlight the disproportionate burdens borne by soldiers in different branches of the armed forces: the infantrymen are mutilated, wounded, suffer, go mad and die, while sailors binge with prostitutes.  One his prints, Soldat und Nonne ("Soldier and nun", K.120) - a graphic image of a soldier attempting to rape a nun -, was withdrawn from the series before it was published, but another Soldat und Hure ("Soldier and whore", K.105) was included under the title Besuch bei Madame Germaine in Méricourt ("Visit to Madame Germaine's in Méricourt").

The series was published in Berlin by Karl Nierendorf, as a folio of fifty engravings, in five portfolios of ten etchings each, entitled Der Krieg ("The War"). Dix gave each engraving a title, location, and description, and they were arranged into sets of ten without taking into account any chronological or temporal order, or the order in which the plates were made. Nierendorf also published a book containing with an introduction by the author Henri Barbusse, in an edition of 10,000 priced at just 1.20 Marks, later increased to 2.40 Marks.

Reception 
Nierendorf collaborated with the pacifist  to circulate the prints throughout Germany. They were an instant critical and popular success, praised for their depiction of the horrific reality of modern warfare in the First World War, but also controversial.  In the 1930s, many of Dix's works were condemned as degenerate art (Entartete Kunst) by the Nazi party.  A complete set of Dix's War prints held by the Kupferstichkabinett Berlin was included in the Degenerate Art Exhibition in 1937.

Complete sets of the 50 folio prints are held by several public collections, including the Historial de la Grande Guerre in Péronne, the Kupferstichkabinett in the Kunsthalle Hamburg, the Museum of Modern Art in New York City, the National Gallery of Australia, and the British Museum.  A complete set of 50 prints, formerly owned by Lothar-Günther Buchheim and deaccessioned as a duplicate from the Buchheim Museum, was sold by Christie's in 2017 for £236,750.  A complete set with a copy of Soldat und Nonne was sold by Sotheby's in 2014 for US$377,000.

List of etchings 
(Using the titles given by Otto Dix)

Notes

References 
 Otto Dix (1891–1969), Der Krieg, Christie's, 19 September 2017
 Otto Dix, Der Krieg (Karsch 70 – 119; and 120), Sotheby's, May 2014
 Otto Dix, Der Krieg (The War) – 1924, Socks, 4 August 2012
 The first world war in German art: Otto Dix's first-hand visions of horror, The Guardian, 14 May 2014
 Art of the apocalypse: Otto Dix's hellish first world war visions – in pictures, The Guardian, 14 May 2014
 Otto Dix, The War (Der Krieg), 1924, portfolio, Museum of Modern Art
 The War (Der Krieg), German Expressionism, Museum of Modern Art
 Top Five: Otto Dix and Der Krieg, Port Magazine, 25 April 2014
 Otto Dix, Der Krieg, British Museum
 Soldatengrab zwischen den Linien / Der Krieg, British Museum
 Der Krieg (The War), National Gallery of Australia

External links 
 Online Otto Dix Project
 Otto Dix – Der Krieg (50 eaux-fortes, part 1), Pinacothèque Virtuelle, 8 March 2018
 Otto Dix – Der Krieg (50 eaux-fortes, part 2), Pinacothèque Virtuelle, 14 March 2018
 Otto Dix, Ker Krieg, Kunsthandel Maas

Anti-war works
War art
1920s prints
Otto Dix etchings